Radu is a Romanian surname, and may refer to:
 Alexandru Radu (born 1982), Romanian football player
 Alexandru Radu (born 1997), Romanian football player
 Andrei Radu (born 1996), Romanian football player
 Carmen Radu (21st century), Romanian businessperson
 Constantin Radu (1945–2020), Romanian football player
 Constantin Radu (1912–unknown), Romanian long-distance runner
 Cosmin Radu (born 1981), Romanian water polo player
 Dan Ghica-Radu (born 1955), Romanian Land Forces general
 Daniel Radu (born 1957), Romanian judo practitioner
 Daniel Radu (born 1959), Romanian boxer
 Daniel Radu (born 1977), Romanian water polo player
 Demetriu Radu (1861–1920), Romanian bishop
 Dumitru Radu (born 1988), Moldavian football player
 Elena Radu (born 1975), Romanian sprint canoer
 Elena-Luminița Radu-Cosma (born 1972), Romanian chess player
 Elie Radu (1853–1931), Romanian civil engineer and academic
 Eugen Radu (born 1978), Romanian luger
 Florian Radu (1920–1991), Romanian football player
 Gelu Radu (born 1957), Romanian weightlifter
 Ionel Radu (born 1969), Romanian handball player
 Ionuț Radu (born 1997), Romanian football player
 Kenneth Radu (born 1945), Canadian writer
 Liviu Radu (1948–2015), Romanian science-fiction writer
 Maria Radu (born 1959), Romanian long-distance runner
 Marin Radu (born 1956), Romanian football player
 Marina Radu (born 1984), Canadian water polo player
 Marius Radu (born 1977), Romanian football player
 Marius Radu (born 1992), Romanian swimmer
 Michael Radu (1947–2009), Romanian-American political scientist
 Paul Radu (21st century), Romanian investigative journalist
 Răzvan Radu (born 1984), Romanian futsal player
 Roy Radu (born 1963), Canadian rugby union player
 Sergiu Radu (born 1977), Romanian football player
 Silvia Radu (born 1935), Romanian sculptor
 Silvia Radu (born 1972), Moldovan politician
 Ștefan Radu (born 1986), Romanian football player
 Valentin Radu (born 1956), Romanian conductor

See also 
 
 Radu (given name)
 Rădulescu (surname)
 Răducan (surname)
 Răducanu (surname)

Romanian-language surnames